Valto Kalevi Koski (born 23 January 1939 in Jaala) is a Finnish plumber and politician. He was a member of the Parliament of Finland from 1995 to 2011, representing the Social Democratic Party of Finland (SDP).

References

1939 births
Living people
People from Jaala
Social Democratic Party of Finland politicians
Members of the Parliament of Finland (1995–99)
Members of the Parliament of Finland (1999–2003)
Members of the Parliament of Finland (2003–07)
Members of the Parliament of Finland (2007–11)